A winged altarpiece (also folding altar) or winged retable is a special form of altarpiece (reredos, occasionally retable), common in Northern and Central Europe, in which the central image, either a painting or relief sculpture (or some combination of the two) can be hidden by hinged wings. It is called a triptych if there are two wings, a pentaptych (but this is rarely used in English) if there are four, or a polyptych if there are four or more. The technical terms are derived from : trís or "triple"; πέντε: pénte or "five"; πολύς: polýs or "many"; and πτυχή: ptychē or "fold, layer".

There are often images on both the insides and outsides of the wings, enabling the altarpiece to display completely different views when open and closed.  It was usually the custom to keep the wings closed except on Sundays or feast days, although very often the sacristan would open them for tourists at any time for a modest tip.  Small winged paintings, usually triptychs, were also owned by the wealthy for private devotions, and services in the house; they had the advantage that the open view was fairly well protected when covered up during travel. 

The form was especially popular in the later Middle Ages, and during the Northern Renaissance.  In the 17th century, Rubens was one of the last major painters to use it. It was never as popular in Italy, where there were many polyptychs, but usually built without hinges, so always "open", even if there were also images on the back, as in the Maestà by Duccio for Siena Cathedral.  

Above the retable may be found the crowning or superstructure,  pinnacles and flowers of the cross. Relics can be housed below it, in a reliquary in the predella lying on the altar stone.

Examples 

 Pacher Altar of St. Wolfgang im Salzkammergut 
 Kefermarkt Altarpiece in Kefermarkt
 Krakow High Altar in St. Mary's Basilica by Veit Stoß.
 Ghent Altarpiece by Jan van Eyck
 Isenheim Altarpiece by Matthias Grünewald
 Herrenberg Altarpiece, Staatsgalerie Stuttgart
 Antwerp Retable
 The largest collection of medieval reredoses in Germany is to be found in St. Anne's Abbey, Lübeck, including the Passion Altarpiece by Hans Memling and the Schonen Altarpiece by Bernt Notke
 
 The Last Judgment by Hans Memling, Gdańsk
 Schwabach Altarpiece in the Church of St. John and St. Martin in Schwabach, a high altar from the workshop of Michael Wolgemut
 The Altar Wings of Roudníky
 Altar of Saint Mary, Alpirsbach Abbey

Literature 
 Herbert Schindler: The Schnitzaltar. Meisterwerke und Meister in Süddeutschland, Österreich und Südtirol. Verlag Friedrich Pustet, Regensburg 1978. 
 Karl-Werner Bachmann, Géza Jászai, Friedrich Kobler, Catheline Périer-D'Ieteren, Barbara Rommé, Norbert Wolf: Flügelretabel, in: Reallexikon zur Deutschen Kunstgeschichte, Vol. 9, 2003, cols. 1450–1536.

See also 
 Triptych
 Polyptych

References

External links 

Website des Kirchspiels Felsberg: Felsberg winged altar

Altars
Christian art

Polyptychs